Rameshraj Tewarikar  (born 15 March 1954) Hindi is a scholar, poet. He is famous for his distinctive talent in the area of Satire and Rasa, and they are one of the major scholars who develop the Tewari and Rasa tradition of poetry.

Early life 
Rameshraj Tewarikar was born on 15 March 1954 in village Aice, district - Aligarh, (Uttar Pradesh). His full name is Ramesh Chandra Gupta and his father Ramcharan Gupta was Brajbhasha folk writer and freedom fighter. while his mother Ganga Devi was an ordinary homemaker. From childhood, He was interested in participating in the school's cultural programs. In childhood, he received literary guidance from his poet-father and through his seminar of poet-friends. He received informal education of poetry writing. He also edited the 'Tewari-Paksh' magazine.

Published works 
 Abhi Zuban Kati Nahin (Tewari- collection)
 Kabir Zinda Hai (Tewri-collection) 
 Itihas Ghayal Hai (Tewari -collections) 
 Ek Prahar: Lagatar (Tewari- collection)

Auto-complete works 
 Tewari Main Ras Samasya Aur Samadhan 
 Vichar Aur Ras (Critical Essay)
 Virodh-Ras
 Kavya Ki Aatma Aur Aatmiyakaran

Tewari-Shatak

Long Tewaries
Aag De Lanka Main, Jai Kanhaiyalal Ki, Ghada Pap Ka Bhar Raha, Man Ke Ghav Naye Na, Dhan Ka Mad Gad-Gad Kare, Mera Hal Sodium Sa Hai, Ravan-Kul Ke Log, Anatar Aah Anant Ati, Puchh Na Kabira Jag Ka Hal, Rameshraj Ke  Charchit Tewari-Sangrah

Shatak (Centuries) 
 Udhau Kahiyo Jaay (Tewari-collection), Madhu-sa-la (Century), Jo Gopi Madhu Ban Gayin (Doha-Century), There is an allpin (Doha-Century), Nadiya Par Hindolana (Doha-Century), Pujata Ab Chhal (Haiku-century)

Freehand Poem-collection 
 Didi Tum Nadi Ho, Wh Yani Mohan Swaroop

Child-poems 
Radhtriya Bal Kavitayein

Awards and honors 
 'Sahitya-Shree', Aligarh, 
 'U.P. Gaurav ', Aligarh' 
 Tevari-Taapas', Hosangabad (MP) 
 'Shikshar-Shree', Aligarh 
 Abhinandan-Sur Sahitya Sangam, Etah
 Parivartan Tewari Ratna, Bulandshashr

He has been honored with many awards.

See also 
 List of Hindi language poets

References

External links
 
रमेशराज तेवरीकार जी की रचनाएँ कविता कोश में
 poemocean
  रमेशराज तेवरीकार जी की रचनाएँ हिन्दी कविता में
 
 रमेशराज तेवरीकार जी की रचनाएँ दिव्य नर्मदा पर
 रमेशराज तेवरीकार जी की रचनाएँ साहित्य-शिल्पी पर

Hindi-language poets
1954 births
People from Uttar Pradesh
People from Aligarh
Living people